Lee's Summit station is an Amtrak train station in Lee's Summit, Missouri, United States. The station was originally built in 1905 by the Missouri Pacific Railroad. Although the station house remains intact, passengers board the trains from an all-glass rail house across the tracks.

See also 
List of Amtrak stations

References

External links 

Lee's Summit, MO – USA Rail Guide (TrainWeb)

Amtrak stations in Missouri
Former Missouri Pacific Railroad stations
Buildings and structures in Lee's Summit, Missouri
Railway stations in the United States opened in 1905